Joseph W. Graboski (January 15, 1930 – July 2, 1998) was an American professional basketball player. He spent 13 seasons in the National Basketball Association (NBA). He was the third player to enter the NBA without having played in college: (Tony Kappen and Connie Simmons being the first two prep-to-pro players).  He was also the second player to play in the league while still being 18 years old. A star at Tuley High School in Chicago, the 6'7" power forward had previously played some basketball with the Philadelphia Sphas while he was a high school junior and senior before he began his professional career with the hometown Chicago Stags, with whom he played from 1949 to 1950.  He also played for the Indianapolis Olympians, Philadelphia Warriors, St. Louis Hawks, and Chicago Packers, and he left the NBA in 1962 with 9,398 career points and 6,104 career rebounds.

BAA/NBA career statistics

Regular season

Playoffs

References

External links

1930 births
1998 deaths
American people of Slavic descent
American men's basketball players
Basketball players from Chicago
Camden Bullets players
Chicago Packers players
Chicago Stags players
Indianapolis Olympians players
Philadelphia Warriors players
Power forwards (basketball)
St. Louis Hawks players
Syracuse Nationals players